Bowden is a census-designated place (CDP) in Randolph County, West Virginia, United States. Bowden has a post office with ZIP code 26254. According to the 2010 Census, there were nine people residing at this location.

References

Census-designated places in Randolph County, West Virginia
Census-designated places in West Virginia